Loch Turret is a large freshwater reservoir on a north-east to south-west orientation, that is located at the head of Glen Turret and  northwest of Crieff in Perth and Kinross. 

The route is a popular walking spot. Below the loch, the Turret Burn continues, and further down hosts Glenturret distillery, that was built in 1775.

Gallery

References

Freshwater lochs of Scotland
Lochs of Perth and Kinross
Tay catchment
Birdwatching sites in Scotland